The Rocori High School shooting was a school shooting that occurred at Rocori High School on September 24, 2003 in Cold Spring, Minnesota, United States. The shooter was identified as 15 year-old freshman John Jason McLaughlin, who murdered 14-year-old freshman Seth Bartell and 17-year-old senior Aaron Rollins. Prior to the shooting, McLaughlin was described as "quiet and withdrawn".

Shooting
McLaughlin (born July 19, 1988) arrived at school with a loaded Colt .22-caliber handgun with the intention of killing Bartell, whom McLaughlin claimed bullied him over his acne. McLaughlin met Bartell and Rollins as they were exiting the school locker room. He shot at Bartell, hitting him in the chest. McLaughlin fired a second shot at Bartell, which missed and hit Rollins in the neck, killing him instantly. Bartell attempted to flee the scene, but was followed by McLaughlin, who fired another shot at Bartell, hitting him in the forehead. Gym coach Mark Johnson then confronted McLaughlin, who initially brandished the gun at Johnson, but then emptied the bullets from the gun and dropped it. Johnson secured the gun and took McLaughlin to the school office.

Bartell was taken to the St. Cloud Hospital, where he was treated for severe head and brain trauma. Bartell died 16 days later, on October 11, 2003.

Legal proceedings

The trial began on July 5, 2005. The defense argued that McLaughlin did not plan to kill anyone and that the teen had only intended to scare Bartell. The prosecution argued that the deaths were premeditated, as McLaughlin had stated to police that he had planned the shooting "several days in advance". Six mental health experts were brought in to testify in court. Three of the experts diagnosed McLaughlin with schizophrenia while the other three diagnosed him with major depression in remission and an "emerging personality disorder".

McLaughlin was found guilty of first and second-degree murder.

In August 2005, he was sentenced with two consecutive prison sentences. McLaughlin was sentenced to life in prison for first-degree murder and 12 years in prison for second-degree murder. Prior to the sentences, McLaughlin's attorneys attempted to have him declared insane at the time of the shootings, which would have resulted with McLaughlin serving his sentence at a mental hospital rather than a correctional facility. The Judge ruled that McLaughlin was sane at the time of the killings based on McLaughlin's writings and videotaped confession, where he detailed his planning of the crime. McLaughlin was also ordered to pay restitution in the amount of $15,000 to the Minnesota Crime Victims Reparations Board.

Jason McLaughlin is currently 34 years-old and was incarcerated at Minnesota Correctional Facility – Stillwater, and is currently at Minnesota Correctional Facility – Oak Park Heights. He will not be eligible for parole until 2038, when he will be 50 years-old.

Wrongful death lawsuit
In September 2006 the families of victims Aaron Rollins and Seth Bartell filed a wrongful death lawsuit against the McLaughlins, the Rocori school district, and former Rocori High School Principal Doug Staska. The families alleged that the school district had prior knowledge of the shootings about a week before their occurrence and that they could have prevented its occurrence. The lawsuit was initially dismissed, but later settled out of court for $200,000.

See also 
 List of school shootings in the United States

References

External links 
Cold Spring School Shooting - Minnesota Public Radio News & Features page on the shooting
Two Years After Rocori Shootings, Trial Begins - news item on the murder trial
 Eric Decker on experiencing school shooting - NFL Denver Broncos' Eric Decker on living through Rocori High School Shooting
 MN Offender Locator - Inmate Information - Department of Corrections -Dead link

2003 murders in the United States
School killings in the United States
School shootings committed by pupils
Murder in Minnesota
Stearns County, Minnesota
2003 in Minnesota
Deaths by firearm in Minnesota
Crimes in Minnesota
Attacks in the United States in 2003
September 2003 events in the United States
High school shootings in the United States